Eoin Culliton is a Gaelic footballer for Laois.

He plays club football for his local club Timahoe and plays as goalkeeper for the Laois senior inter-county team.

References

Year of birth missing (living people)
Living people
Gaelic football goalkeepers
Laois inter-county Gaelic footballers
Timahoe Gaelic footballers